Francis Shanley (1889 – 4 July 1917) was an English amateur footballer who made one appearance in the Football League for Preston North End as a goalkeeper.

Personal life 
Shanley had two brothers and prior to the First World War, he worked as an attendant at the Whittingham Asylum. In May 1915, 9 months after Britain's entry into the First World War, Shanley enlisted as a private in the Gordon Highlanders. He was posted to the Western Front in June 1916 and one month later was evacuated back to Britain after suffering a gunshot wound to the right knee. He arrived at Cambuslang Hospital on 17 July 1916 and convalesced at Alnwick Military Convalescent Hospital between 25 August and 13 October 1916. Shanley was posted to F Company of the 9th Battalion on 18 April 1917 and received multiple gunshot wounds to the back in the Ypres Salient on 3 July 1917. He died of his wounds the following day at the 3rd Canadian Casualty Clearing Station, Remy Farm. Shanley was buried in Lijssenthoek Military Cemetery.

Career statistics

References

External links 
 

English Football League players
1889 births
1917 deaths
Sportspeople from Lancashire
Nelson F.C. players
Preston North End F.C. players
Association football goalkeepers
British military personnel killed in World War I
British Army personnel of World War I
Gordon Highlanders soldiers
English footballers
Burials at Lijssenthoek Military Cemetery
Deaths by firearm in Belgium